Rajlich is a surname. Notable people with the surname include:

Iweta Rajlich (born 1981), Polish chess player
Petr Rajlich (born 1944), Czech geologist
Vasik Rajlich (born 1971), American chess player

See also
Rajsich